Highway 37 is a highway in the Canadian province of Saskatchewan. It runs from Montana Secondary Highway 241 at the US border near Port of Climax to Highway 32 at Cabri. This north-south route connects with the horseshoe tourism route at Shaunavon. Going west on the Red Coat Trail Highway 13 leads to Eastend, known for its dinosaur museum. Further west and north is Maple Creek, a cowboy town of the current era.

Highway 37 passes near the communities of Climax, Shaunavon, and Gull Lake, as well as Port of Climax and Cabri. Highway 37 connects with Highways 18, 722, 13, 631, 1, 322, and 738.

History

Saskatchewan Highways and Transportation (SHT), now the Ministry of Highways and Infrastructure undertook a landslide risk management system program to monitor risk sites, apply technological innovations to prevent any further erosion of the riverbank and plan responses to future landslide movement detected by monitors. Highway 37 south of Shaunavon along the Frenchman River has experienced land slides.

Major intersections
From south to north:

Footnotes

References 

037